Pierre-Edmé Babel (11 November 1720 – 26 October 1775) was a French engraver. Babel designed pieces for the Palace of Versailles, today they are seen in the Hall of Mirrors at the Palace. Works by Babel are held in the collection of the Cooper-Hewitt, National Design Museum, Metropolitan Museum of Art, Victoria and Albert Museum and the Harvard Art Museums.

References

1720 births
1775 deaths
18th-century engravers
French engravers